Lt-Col. Alan Payan Pryce-Jones TD (18 November 1908 – 22 January 2000) was a British book critic, writer, journalist and Liberal Party politician. He was notably editor of The Times Literary Supplement from 1948 to 1959.

Background
Pryce-Jones was the son of Henry Morris Pryce-Jones, CB, CVO, DSO, MC and Marion Vere Payan Dawnay. His grandfather was the merchant entrepreneur Sir Pryce Pryce-Jones of Montgomeryshire. Alan was educated at Eton and Magdalen College, Oxford. In 1968 he married Mrs Mary Jean Kempner Thorne.

Professional career
Pryce-Jones was assistant editor, The London Mercury, 1928–32. He served in the war of 1939–45 in France, Italy and Austria. He was editor, The Times Literary Supplement, 1948–59, book critic for the New York Herald Tribune, 1963–66, the World Journal Tribune, 1967–68, Newsday, 1969–71, and theatre critic for Theatre Arts from 1963. He was director, Old Vic Trust, 1950–61, He was a member of Council, Royal College of Music, 1956–61, and program associate, The Humanities and Arts Program, Ford Foundation, NY, 1961–63.

Political career
Pryce-Jones joined the Liberal Party in 1937 in response to the party's stance against Nazi Germany fashioned by party leader Sir Archibald Sinclair and supported by Winston Churchill whom he admired. He became vice-president of the St Marylebone Liberal Association and not long after he was adopted as Prospective Liberal Parliamentary Candidate for Louth in Lincolnshire, in succession to Margaret Wintringham. who had been adopted as candidate at Gainsborough. However, his political career was cut short by the outbreak of the Second World War.

He was a trustee of the National Portrait Gallery, 1950–61.

Publications
The Spring Journey, 1931
People in the South, 1932
Beethoven, 1933
27 Poems, 1935
Private Opinion, 1936 
Nelson, an opera, 1954
Vanity Fair, a musical play, (with Robin Miller and Julian Slade) 1962 
The Bonus of Laughter (autobiography), 1987

References

External links 
Alan Pryce-Jones Papers. Beinecke Rare Book and Manuscript Library, Yale University.
Guardian Obituary: https://www.theguardian.com/news/2000/feb/09/guardianobituaries3

1908 births
2000 deaths
Liberal Party (UK) parliamentary candidates
People educated at Eton College
Alumni of Magdalen College, Oxford
Presidents of the English Centre of PEN